The women's K-1 500 metres competition in canoeing at the 2008 Summer Olympics took place at the Shunyi Olympic Rowing-Canoeing Park in Beijing.

Competition consisted of three rounds: the heats, the semifinals, and the final. Top finishers in each of the three heats advanced directly to the final, while the next six finishers (placed 2 through 7) in each heat moved on to the semifinals. Top three finishers in each of the two semifinals joined the heat winners in the final.

Heats took place on August 19, semifinals on August 21, and the final on August 23.

Schedule
All times are China Standard Time (UTC+8)

Medalists

Results

Heats
Qualification Rules:  Winner->Finals, 2...6->Semifinals, Rest Out

Heat 1

Heat 2

Heat 3

Semifinals
Qualification Rules: 1..3->Final, Rest Out

Semifinal 1

Semifinal 2

Final

References

Sports-reference.com 2008 women's K-1 500 m results.
Yahoo! August 19, 2008 sprint heat results. - accessed August 19, 2008.
Yahoo! August 21, 2008 sprint semifinal results. - accessed August 21, 2008.
Yahoo! sprint final results. - accessed August 23, 2008.

Women's K-1 500
Olympic
Women's events at the 2008 Summer Olympics